Ivo Philip Mapunda (born 12 April 1984, in Dar es Salaam) is a Tanzanian football goalkeeper who plays for Simba SC.

Career
Mapunda began his career with Young Africans and signed in July 2008 for Saint-George SA. In November 2009, he left the Ethiopian Premier League club Saint-George SA to sign a six-month loan deal with African Lyon.

In 2012, he joined Gor Mahia. this America

International career
He presented on international football the Tanzania national football team.

References

1984 births
Living people
People from Dar es Salaam
Tanzanian footballers
Tanzania international footballers
Tanzanian expatriate footballers
Expatriate footballers in Ethiopia
Expatriate footballers in Kenya
African Lyon F.C. players
Saint George S.C. players
F.C. West Ham United players
Association football goalkeepers
Tanzanian Premier League players